Microchela is an extinct genus of prawn, which contains a single species Microchela rostrata.

References

Penaeidae
Late Cretaceous crustaceans
Monotypic crustacean genera
Cenomanian genera
Fossil taxa described in 1994
Late Cretaceous arthropods of Asia
Fossils of Lebanon
Cretaceous Lebanon